The COVID-19 pandemic began in Asia in Wuhan, Hubei, China, and has spread widely through the continent.

The Asian countries with the highest numbers of confirmed coronavirus cases are India, South Korea, Turkey, Vietnam, and Iran. Despite being the first area of the world hit by the outbreak, the early wide-scale response of some Asian states, particularly Bhutan, Singapore, Taiwan, and Vietnam has allowed them to fare comparatively well. China was criticised for initially minimising the severity of the outbreak, but its wide-scale response has largely contained the disease since March 2020.

As of July 2021, the highest numbers of deaths are recorded in India, Indonesia, Iran, and Turkey, each with more than 90,000 deaths and more than 900,000 deaths combined.  However, the death toll in Iran and Indonesia are claimed to be much higher than the official figures. Per capita, the highest deaths have been disproportionally in several Western Asian states, with Georgia having the highest figure closely followed by Armenia, and Iran in third, whereas China had the lowest.

Statistics by country and territory

Timeline by country and territory

Afghanistan 

On 23 February 2020, at least three citizens of Herat who had recently returned from Qom were suspected of COVID-19 infection. Blood samples were sent to Kabul for further testing. Afghanistan later closed its border with Iran.

On 24 February, Afghanistan confirmed the first COVID-19 case involving one of the three people from Herat, a 35-year-old man who tested positive for SARS-CoV-2. On 7 March, three new cases were confirmed in Herat Province. On 10 March, the first case reported outside of Herat province, was in Samangan Province, bringing to the total to five cases.

Armenia 

Armenia confirmed the first case of coronavirus during the late night of 29 February/early morning of 1 March, announcing a 29-year-old Armenian citizen had returned from Iran and was confirmed positive for the virus. His wife was tested and results came in negative. Prime Minister Nikol Pashinyan declared that he is "now in good condition". About 30 people who came in contact with him are being tested and will be quarantined. Armenia had earlier closed its border with Iran. As of 15 March there are 23 confirmed cases with over 300 being in quarantine.

On 23 March, it confirmed 23 cases.

Azerbaijan 

On 28 February, Azerbaijan confirmed the first case from a Russian national, who was travelling from Iran. On 12 March, a woman died from multiorgan failure who had been diagnosed with COVID-19 a day earlier. This marked the first death of coronavirus in Azerbaijan. On 22 March, the first domestic human to human transmission was confirmed. On 31 March, Azerbaijan declared nationwide quarantine. People are required to stay in private houses and apartments, permanent or temporary places of residence until 20 April.

Bahrain 

The first case in the country was confirmed on 21 February. The index case was a school bus driver who had travelled to Iran. Bahrain has recorded a total of 2,009 COVID-19 cases including 7 deaths and 1,026 recoveries. The Bahraini government has unveiled a stimulus packages of 4.3 billion Bahraini Dinars that include exempting consumers from bills of electricity and water for three months.

Bangladesh 
The first three COVID-19 cases of the country were found on 7 March 2020 that was officially confirmed on 8 March 2020 by Professor Dr Meerjady Sabrina Flora, Former Director, Institute of Epidemiology, Disease Control and Research (IEDCR), then. Two of those affected returned to Bangladesh from Italy and one was a family member of one of those two. On 18 March, the first known coronavirus death in the country was reported.

On 22 March, Bangladesh declared a 10-day shut down effective from 26 March to 4 April to fight the spread of coronavirus.
Bangladesh on Wednesday reported the fifth death from the coronavirus though no new case of the infection came out in the last 24 hours as the country suspended all domestic flights, trains and public transport to fight the pandemic.

The Institute of Epidemiology, Disease Control and Research (IEDCR) has confirmed that one more person has died of coronavirus (COVID-19) infection in Bangladesh, taking the number of deaths from the disease in the country to five, the Dhaka Tribune reported.

Bangladesh on Wednesday confirmed another death taking the death toll in the country to six while number of positive cases rose to 54.The nationwide lockdown has been extended till 9 April to curb the spread, however Prime Minister Sheikh Hasina on Tuesday said that offices and industries could resume work. Health minister Zahid Malik said "another 300 ventilators are being imported. There are about 700 ventilators across private hospitals".

Bhutan 

On 6 March, the first case in the country was confirmed, a 76-year-old US male who travelled to the country.

Brunei 

On 9 March, the Ministry of Health confirmed that a preliminary coronavirus test had returned positive for a 53-year-old male who had returned from Kuala Lumpur, Malaysia on 3 March. The patient was moved to the National Isolation Centre in Tutong for treatment.

Cambodia 

On 27 January, Cambodia confirmed the first COVID-19 case in Sihanoukville, a 60-year-old Chinese man, travelling to the coastal city from Wuhan with his family on 23 January. Three other members of his family were placed under quarantine as they did not appear to have symptoms, while he was placed in a separate room at the Preah Sihanouk Referral Hospital.
By 10 February, after two weeks of being treated and kept under observation, he had fully recovered, Health Ministry stated on account of testing negative for the third time by Pasteur Institute of Cambodia. The family were finally discharged and flew back to their home country on the next day as of the 80 Chinese nationals who arrived in Sihanoukville on the same flight as the patient, most had since returned to China, although the city of Wuhan remained under quarantine at that time.

China 

The COVID-19 pandemic first originated in Wuhan, Hubei in which it manifested itself as cluster of mysterious suspected pneumonia cases. Sophisticated modelling of the outbreak suggests that the number of cases in mainland China would have been many times higher without interventions such as early detection, and isolation of the infected.

Following the initial outbreak, China opted for containment, inflicting strict lockdowns to eliminate spread.
The vaccines distributed in China included the BIBP, WIBP, and CoronaVac. It was reported on 11 December 2021, that China had vaccinated 1.162 billion of its citizens, or 82.5% of the total population of the country against COVID-19. China's large-scale adoption of zero-COVID had largely contained the first waves of infections of the disease. When the waves of infections due to the Omicron variant followed, China was almost alone in pursuing the strategy of zero-Covid to combat the spread of the virus in 2022. Lockdown continued to be employed in November to combat a new wave of cases; however, protests erupted in cities across China over the country's stringent measures, and in December that year, the country relaxed its zero-COVID policy. On 20 December 2022, the Chinese State Council narrowed its definition of what would be counted as a COVID-19 death to include solely respiratory failure, which led to skepticism by health experts of the government's total death count at a time when hospitals reported being overwhelmed with cases following the abrupt discontinuation of zero-COVID. 

On 29 December 2022, the U.S. joined Italy, Japan, Taiwan and India in requiring negative COVID-19 test results from all people traveling from China due to the new surge in cases. The European Union initially refused similar measures, stating that the BF7 omicron variant had already spread throughout Europe without becoming dominant, but changed its stance following an emergency meeting of EU diplomats on 4 January 2023.

Christmas Island
On 8 March, the Australian external territory of Christmas Island reported its first case of COVID-19.

Cyprus 

On 9 March, Cyprus confirmed its first 2 cases, one in Nicosia and one in Limassol.

East Timor 

On 20 March, East Timor confirmed its first COVID-19 case.

Georgia 

All flights from China and Wuhan to Tbilisi International Airport were cancelled until 27 January. The Health Ministry announced that all arriving passengers from China would be screened. Georgia also temporarily shut down all flights to Iran.

On 26 February, Georgia confirmed its first COVID-19 case. A 50-year-old man, who returned to Georgia from Iran, was admitted to Infectious Diseases Hospital in Tbilisi. He came back to the Georgian border via Azerbaijan by taxi.

On 28 February, Georgia confirmed that a 31-year-old Georgia woman who had travelled to Italy tested positive and was admitted to Infectious Diseases Hospital in Tbilisi.

29 more are being kept in isolation in a Tbilisi hospital, with Head of the Georgian National Centre for Disease Control, Amiran Gamkrelidze stating there was a "high probability" that some of them have the virus.

On 5 March, five people have tested positive for the new coronavirus COVID-19 in Georgia increasing the total number of people infected in the country to nine. Head of the Georgian National Centre for Disease Control Amiran Gamkrelidze made the announcement at the recent news briefing following today. He said, all of the five people belong to the same cluster who travelled together to Italy and returned to Georgia on Sunday.

On 7 March, three people have tested positive for the new coronavirus in Georgia increasing the total number of people infected individuals in the country to twelve. Head of the Georgian National Centre for Disease Control Amiran Gamkrelidze said at a news briefing the following day that there is still no reason to panic. One of the infected individuals is Gamkrelidze's son Nikoloz. Gamkrelidze wrote on his Facebook page that he contracted the illness from a coworker, who has been tested positive for COVID-19 on Wednesday. Georgia has suspended direct flights with Italy to prevent the spread of coronavirus in the country. Coronavirus in Georgia has mostly been detected in passengers who have travelled in Italy recently.

Hong Kong 

As of 1 March, Hong Kong's Centre for Health Protection had identified 100 cases (Including 2 Suspected Recovered Cases) in Hong Kong, with 36 patients since recovered and 2 died. By 2 April, the number of confirmed or probable cases in Hong Kong has risen to 767 after an influx of returning overseas students. 467, or 60.89% of cases were imported cases.

India

Indonesia 

COVID-19 was confirmed to have spread to Indonesia on 2 March 2020, after a dance instructor and her mother tested positive for the virus. Both were infected from a Japanese national.

By 9 April 2020, the pandemic had spread to all 34 provinces in the country at that time. Jakarta, West Java, and Central Java are the worst-hit provinces, together accounting more than half of the national total cases. On 13 July 2020, the recoveries exceeded active cases for the first time.

With  deaths, Indonesia ranks second in Asia and ninth in the world. Review of data, however, indicated that the number of deaths may be much higher than what has been reported as those who died with acute COVID-19 symptoms but had not been confirmed or tested were not counted in the official death figure.

Indonesia has tested  people against its 270 million population so far, or around  people per million. The World Health Organization has urged the nation to perform more tests, especially on suspected patients.

Instead of implementing a nationwide lockdown, the government applied "Large-Scale Social Restrictions" (abbreviated as PSBB), which was later modified into the "Community Activities Restrictions Enforcement" (abbreviated as PPKM). On 30 December 2022, the restrictions were lifted for all regions in Indonesia since satisfied population immunity exceeded the expectation, although it did not lift the pandemic status.

On 13 January 2021, President Joko Widodo was vaccinated at the presidential palace, officially kicking off Indonesia's vaccination program.

Iran 

Iran reported its first confirmed cases of SARS-CoV-2 infections on 19 February 2020 in Qom. Later that day, the Ministry of Health and Medical Education stated that both had died.

By 21 February, a total of 18 people had been confirmed to have SARS-CoV-2 infections and four COVID-19 deaths had occurred. On 24 February, according to the Ministry of Health and Medical Education, twelve COVID-19 deaths had occurred in Iran, out of a total of 64 SARS-CoV-2 confirmed infections.

On 25 February, Iran's Deputy Health Minister, Iraj Harirchi tested positive for COVID-19, having shown some signs of infection during the press conference. On 3 March, the official number of deaths in Iran rose to 77, the second highest deaths recorded outside China after Italy which has surpassed Iran, although the number of deaths is believed to be higher, up to 1,200 deaths due to Iranian Government's censorship and its eventual mishandling of virus outbreak. Iran currently has the most cases in Western Asia as well as the fourth most cases worldwide, with China, South Korea, and Italy surpassing Iran.

Iran's death toll goes to 2,234 on 26 March as 29,000 cases are reported. Public gatherings are banned as is transportation between cities; public parks are closed.

Iraq 

The first case in the country was confirmed on 22 February.

Israel 

On 21 February, Israel confirmed the first case of COVID-19.

On 20 March, the first confirmed death in Israel was reported.

As of 9 August, there are a total of 82,324 confirmed cases, with 57,071 recovered and 593 deaths.

Japan 

16 January 2020, the first case was confirmed in a 30-year-old Chinese national who had previously travelled to Wuhan, developed a fever on 3 January, and returned to Japan on 6 January. He was a resident of the Kanagawa prefecture The first mass infection was confirmed on a cruise ship returning to Japan, with 713 cases and 13 deaths. The cruise ship left Yokohama on 20 January 2020 and called at Kagoshima, Hong Kong, Vietnam, Taiwan and Okinawa before returning to Yokohama on 3 February.

Since then, there have been 6 peaks of infection and death in Japan by February 2022, with the fifth being caused by the Delta variant and the sixth by the Omicron variant. As of February 2022, the total number of infected persons was about 4.16 million and the total number of deaths was about 21,000. 

The 2020 Tokyo Olympics was postponed from July 2020 to July 2021 due to COVID-19. Around the same time as the Olympics began, the delta variant began to spread in Japan, marking the fifth peak in COVID-19 infections since the Games ended.

Jordan 

On 2 March, the first case in the country was confirmed. Jordan has 212 confirmed infections on 26 March. Anyone who disobeys nightly curfew will be fined up to 500 dinars (around $700). The government placed Irbid under quarantine after it recorded 26 cases in the area.

Kazakhstan 

On 13 March, the first two cases in the country were confirmed.

As of 10 June, there are 13,319 confirmed cases with 62 deaths.

Kuwait 

The first case in the country was confirmed on 24 February.

The Kuwaiti prime minister stressed that the State of Kuwait greatly values the contribution of the large Indian community there and would continue to ensure their safety and welfare in the present situation, a statement issued by the Prime Minister's Office said.

Modi expressed his thanks and appreciation for the reassurance.

Both leaders discussed the domestic and international aspects of the ongoing COVID-19 pandemic, the statement said.

Kyrgyzstan 

On 18 March, the first three cases in the country were confirmed.
Kyrgyzstan had confirmed its first three coronavirus cases, Healthcare Minister Kosmosbek Cholponbayev said on Wednesday.

Three Kyrgyz nationals tested positive after arriving from Saudi Arabia.

Laos 

As of 23 April, there are 19 confirmed cases in Laos.

Lebanon 

On 21 February 2020, Lebanon confirmed the first case of COVID-19, a 45-year-old woman travelling from Qom, Iran tested positive for SARS-CoV-2 and was transferred to a hospital in Beirut. Lebanon had 386 cases and nine deaths through 25 March, when it instituted a lockdown through 12 April. Essential services, such as drugstores and supermarkets, must close at nightfall.

The number of COVID-19 infections remained unchanged at 333, NNA said.

Meanwhile, the cabinet decided to extend the curfew to 13 April, citing the increasing number of coronavirus infections.

Macau 

The first case in Macau was confirmed on 22 January. As of 9 August, Macau has confirmed 46 cases, with all cases discharged.

Malaysia 

Eight Chinese nationals were quarantined at a hotel in Johor Bahru on 24 January after coming into contact with an infected person in neighbouring Singapore. Despite early reports of them testing negative for the virus, three of them were confirmed to be infected on 25 January.

On 16 February, the 15th infected patient involving a Chinese female national had fully recovered, becoming the 8th patient cured from the virus in Malaysia. The following day, the first infected Malaysian also reportedly recovered, becoming the 9th cured.

In March 2020, several Southeast Asian countries experienced a significant rise in cases following an event held by Tablighi Jamaat at Jamek Mosque in Sri Petaling, Kuala Lumpur, where many people are believed to have been infected. By 17 March, almost two-thirds of the 673 cases confirmed in Malaysia were related to the event. More than 620 people, including those from other countries, who attended the event have tested positive, making it the largest-known centre of transmission in South East Asia. In response to the rapid spread of cases, the Government introduced Movement Control Order lockdown restrictions on 18 March 2020, which helped to lower the infection and death rates. 

The number of active cases peaked in April and slowly declined, leading to a relaxation of Movement Control Order lockdown restrictions over the next several months. Since mid-September, an outbreak of cases in Sabah, Selangor, Negeri Sembilan, Johor, Penang and Kedah led to a resurgence of COVID-19 cases throughout the country. By 18 November 2020, the total number of cases in Malaysia had exceeded the 50,000 mark. A Sin Chew Daily editorial has attributed the rapid surge of cases to the failure of the public, businesses and their employees including migrant workers to practise health and social distancing procedures during the relaxation of Movement Control Order restrictions throughout 2020.

By 24 December 2020, the total number of cases in Malaysia had exceeded the 100,000 mark. By 6 January 2021, the number of recovered had exceeded 100,000. On the same day, the Director General reported there were 252 active clusters in Malaysia. In late February 2021, the Malaysian Government government launched a twelve-month immunization program, with Prime Minister Muhyiddin Yassin being the first individual to receive the COVID-19 vaccine.

By 22 May, the total number of cases had reached the 500,000 mark, reaching 505,115. By 2 June 2021, the total number of recoveries had exceeded the 500,000 mark, reaching 501,898. By 4 July, eight percent of the Malaysian population (roughly 2,618,316 people) had completed two doses of COVID-19 vaccination.

On 26 July, the total number of cases exceeded the one million mark, reaching 1,013,438. By 5 August, the death toll had reached the 10,000 mark, reaching 10,019. By 7 August, the total number of recoveries had reached the 1 million mark, reaching 1,009,343.

Maldives 

On 7 March, the first two cases in the country were confirmed. By 21 July there are 3,252 confirmed cases in Maldives.

Mongolia 

On 10 March, the first case have been confirmed, a 57-year-old French citizen came from Moscow-Ulaanbaatar flight on 2 March and symptoms were shown on 7 March.

Myanmar 

On 23 March, Myanmar confirmed its first and second COVID-19 cases.
Myanmar reported its first coronavirus death on 31 March, a 69-year-old man who also had cancer and died in a hospital in the commercial capital of Yangon, a government spokeswoman said.

He had sought medical treatment in Australia and stopped in Singapore on his way home, according to the health ministry.

After the coup d'état on 1 February 2021, testing collapsed and the medical response to COVID-19 in the country became severely hampered.

Nepal 

A Nepali student who had returned to Kathmandu from Wuhan became the first case of the country and South Asia on 23 January 2020. The first case of local transmission inside the country was confirmed on 4 April, while the first COVID-19 death came on 14 May. The country observed an almost four-month-long nationwide lockdown between 24 March and 21 July.

North Korea 

North Korea was one of the first countries to close borders due to COVID-19. In February 2020, wearing face masks was obligatory and visiting public places such as restaurants was forbidden. Ski resorts and spas were closed and military parades, marathons, and other public events were cancelled.

On 31 March 2020, the Asia Times reported that North Korea's measures against the pandemic seemed largely successful. Edwin Salvador, WHO's representative in North Korea, reported that as of 2 April 709 people had been tested, with no confirmed cases, and 509 people were in quarantine. On 23 April, US analyst website 38 North reported that North Korea's early and extensive response appeared to be successful in containing the virus.

Some anonymous reports claimed that North Korea was ineffective in curbing the disease, and that an order was enacted to 'spot and shoot', so as to hide the cases being reported nationwide. Rumours also spread that first cases were reported when three soldiers were found infected, and that they were shot to death.

On 8 May 2022, samples collected from a group of people experiencing fevers were tested positive for the Omicron variant.

On 12 May 2022, North Korea confirmed its first official COVID-19 outbreak and imposed a nationwide lockdown.

Oman 

On 24 February, the first two cases in the country were confirmed. As of 22 July, there are a total of 69,887 confirmed cases, with 46,608 discharged and 337 deaths.

Pakistan

Pakistan reported its first two cases of COVID-19 on 26 February 2020. By early September 2020, Pakistan had the 10th-highest number of confirmed cases in Asia.

Palestine 

The first seven cases were confirmed in the State of Palestine on 5 March.

Philippines

Qatar 

Qatar confirmed its first case on 29 February, in a person who had returned from Iran. The first death in Qatar was recorded in on 28 March 2020, a 57-year-old Bangladeshi national who was already suffering from chronic disease.

Russia 

Russia implemented preventive measures to curb the spread of COVID-19 in the country by imposing quarantines, carrying raids on potential virus carriers and using facial recognition to impose quarantine measures.

On 31 January, two cases were confirmed, one in Tyumen Oblast, another in Zabaykalsky Krai. Both were Chinese nationals, who have since recovered. By 17 April, first case was confirmed in the Altai Republic, thus all 27 federal subjects of Asian Russia had confirmed cases.

Saudi Arabia 

On 27 February, Saudi Arabia announced temporary suspension of entry for individuals wanting to perform Umrah pilgrimage in Mecca or to visit the Prophet's Mosque in Medina, as well as tourists. The rule was also extended to visitors traveling from countries where SARS-CoV-2 posed a risk.

On 28 February, the Foreign Minister of Saudi Arabia announced a temporary suspension of entry for Gulf Cooperation Council (GCC) citizens to Mecca and Medina. Citizens of the GCC who had been in Saudi Arabia for more than 14 continuous days and didn't show any symptoms of COVID-19 would be excluded from this rule.

Saudi Arabia confirmed the first case on 2 March, a Saudi national returning from Iran via Bahrain.

On Thursday, 19 March Saudi Arabia suspended the holding of daily prayers and the weekly Friday prayers inside and outside the walls of the two mosques in Mecca and Medina  to limit the spread of coronavirus. As of Thursday, 334 confirmed cases have been reported in Saudi Arabia with eight cases been recovered. No deaths have been reported.

On Friday, 20 March, Saudi Arabia announced it is going to suspend all domestic flights, buses, taxis and trains for 14 days amid the COVID-19 pandemic.

At the virtual G20 meeting, chaired by King Salman on 25 March, collective pledges were made to inject $4.8 trillion into the global economy to counteract the social and financial impacts of the pandemic.

On 26 March, authorities announced a total lockdown of Riyadh, Mecca and Medina, plus a nationwide curfew. 1,012 cases and four deaths are reported.

Singapore

South Korea 

The first confirmed case in South Korea was announced 20 January 2020. The number of confirmed cases increased on 19 February by 20, and on 20 February by 58, giving a total of 346 confirmed cases on 21 February 2020, according to the Centers for Disease Control and Prevention Korea (KCDC), with the sudden jump mostly attributed to "Patient No. 31" who attended a gathering at a Shincheonji Church of Jesus the Temple of the Tabernacle of the Testimony church in Daegu. , the number of confirmed cases in South Korea was the third largest after China and the infections on the Diamond Princess. A reason for the high number of confirmed cases is the high number of tests conducted. In South Korea more than 66,650 people were tested within a week of its first case of community transmission, and South Korea quickly became able to test 10,000 people a day.

Sri Lanka 

The first case in the country was confirmed on 27 January 2020. The country has 135,796 cases with 892 deaths as of 13 May 2021. As of 10 October 2020, Sri Lankan authorities have tracked down over 1,430,864 people who had contacted the identified patients and had ordered self quarantine for such people. Near tested 3 million PCR tested on 5 May 2021.

Syria 

Due to Syria already coping with the rampant civil war, fearing that Syria will be the most affected country is raising concerns, following a number of cases found in neighboring Iraq, Lebanon and Jordan, and collapsed healthcare system as the result of the civil war. The Government of Iraqi Kurdistan, in a rare collaboration with its Syrian counterpart on 2 March, ordered complete closure of Syrian–Iraqi border to halt the spread.

The first case in Syria was confirmed on 22 March.

Taiwan 

The pandemic has had a smaller impact in Taiwan than in most other industrialized countries, with a total of eleven deaths out of a population of 23 million as of 11 April 2021, a rate of 0.042 deaths per 100,000 people. The number of active cases peaked on 6 April 2020 at 307 cases. Out of approximately 1,000 cases total, only 77 (along with one additional case of unknown origin) were infected within Taiwan due to strict border control and quarantine measures of incoming travelers and thorough contact tracing of all confirmed cases, allowing for minimal disruption of society, education, and industry. No lockdowns have been imposed in Taiwan. All the other cases have been imported from abroad.

Tajikistan 

On 30 April 2020, the first 15 cases of COVID-19 were reported in Tajikistan.

Thailand 

On 13 January, Thailand had its first case, also the first outside China.

On 1 March, the first confirmed death in Thailand was reported.

As of 19 July, there were a total of 3,246 confirmed cases with 58 deaths and 3,096 recoveries.

Turkey

United Arab Emirates 

The first case in the United Arab Emirates was confirmed on 29 January 2020. It was the first country in the Middle East to report a confirmed case.

The first death due to COVID-19 was reported on 20 March 2020.

Uzbekistan 

On 15 March, the first case in the country was confirmed.

Vietnam 

The first two confirmed cases in Vietnam were admitted to Cho Ray Hospital, Ho Chi Minh City on 23 January 2020: a 66-year-old Chinese man traveling from Wuhan to Hanoi to visit his son, and his son who believed to have contracted the virus from his father when they met in Nha Trang.

On 21 March, Vietnam suspended entry for all foreigners from midnight of 22 March, and concentrated isolation for 14 days in all cases of entry for Vietnamese citizens. From 1 April, Vietnam implemented nationwide isolation for 15 days.

Yemen 

The pandemic was confirmed to have spread to Yemen when its first confirmed case in Hadhramaut was reported on 10 April.

The country is seen to be extremely vulnerable to the outbreak, given the dire humanitarian situation due to the civil war, exacerbated by the famine, cholera outbreaks, and military blockade by Saudi Arabia and allies.

Prevention in other countries and territories

Turkmenistan 

, there are no confirmed COVID-19 cases in Turkmenistan. The government has censored use of the word "coronavirus" to control information about the virus, and experts suspect that it may be spreading in the country unreported.

Turkmenistan is a notoriously opaque state, purposefully isolated by an authoritarian regime led by former president Gurbanguly Berdimuhamedow, who has also been described as totalitarian. Independent media in the country is virtually nonexistent so reporting about the current situation is difficult due to the inability to access and confirm reliable information from the country.

See also 
 COVID-19 pandemic by country and territory

Notes 

Map Notes

References

Further reading 
 Agarwal, Sumit, et al. eds. Impact of COVID-19 on Asian Economies and Policy Responses (2021) excerpt
 M. Mofijur et al. "Impact of COVID-19 on the social, economic, environmental and energy domains: Lessons learnt from a global pandemic" Sustainable Production and Consumption (2020), doi: Impact of COVID-19 on the social, economic, environmental and energy domains: Lessons learnt from a global pandemic

External links 
Coronavirus COVID-19 Global Cases and historical data by Johns Hopkins University

 
coronavirus
coronavirus
Health disasters in Asia
Asia